Conchagüita is a volcanic island in the Gulf of Fonseca, eastern El Salvador.

In October 1892, an earthquake triggered a large landslide at the volcano, and the resulting dust cloud was first thought to be new volcanic ash. The event was discredited as volcanic eruption by the Smithsonian Institution.

See also
List of volcanoes in El Salvador
List of stratovolcanoes

References 
 

Islands of El Salvador
Mountains of El Salvador
Stratovolcanoes of El Salvador
Pleistocene stratovolcanoes
Protected areas of El Salvador